Wu Yin may refer to:

Wu Yin (Qing dynasty), co-founder of the Xiling Seal Society
Wu Yin (actress) (1909–91), Chinese film and drama actress 
Wu Yin (handballer) (born 1988), Chinese team handball player

See also
Wu Ying (born 1981), businesswoman convicted of financial fraud